Simpson Park, officially Simpson Park Hammock, is a  urban park and nature preserve located between Brickell and The Roads neighborhoods of Miami, Florida.

The soils are mostly shallow muck (Matecumbe Series) over limestone. In 1927 the park's name was changed in honor of Miami botanist and conservationist Charles Torrey Simpson. In 1940 an additional  of adjacent hammock was incorporated into the park. A building known as the Charles Torrey Simpson Garden Center was constructed on this addition in 1941. This is also the main entrance to the park, at 55 SW 17th Road. 

Simpson Park is home to 15 endangered plant species, such as Licaria triandra, and 9 threatened plant species. Being a remnant of local regional ecology in the highly developed downtown area, Simpson Park has the qualities of an urban wild or "passive park".

Hurricane Irma
In September 2017, the park was closed for months after its canopy was heavily damaged by Hurricane Irma.

Gallery

References

Parks in Miami
Parks in Miami-Dade County, Florida
Nature reserves in Florida
Protected areas established in 1913
1913 establishments in Florida